Thiva Football Club is a Greek football club based in Thebes, Greece.

History
It was founded in 1968 after the merger of Kadmos Thiva F.C. (named after Cadmus) and Ionikos Asteras F.C. The colours of the club are cherry and black and the logo is an ancient Theban shield.

Honours

Titles and Honours
 Gamma Ethniki Champions: 2
 1971–72, 1981–82
 League of FCA Champions: 1
 2016
 Delta Ethniki Champions: 1
 2005-06
 Euboea-Boeotia FCA / Boeotia FCA Champions: 8
 1968–69, 1971–72 / 1976–77, 1980–81, 1988–89, 2002–03, 2014–15, 2015–16
 Boeotia FCA Cup Winners: 11
 1978–79, 1979–80, 1981–82, 1989–90, 1990–91, 1991–92, 1993–94, 1995–96, 2003–04, 2014–15, 2017–18

Participations

Football League
1969/70, 1972/73, 1982/83

Gamma Ethniki
1977/78, 1981/82, 1983/84, 1984/85, 1985/86, 1986/87, 2006/07, 2007/08, 2016/17, 2017/18

References

Boeotia
Football clubs in Central Greece
Association football clubs established in 1968
Gamma Ethniki clubs